Freeze Lounge is an Indian chain of ice bars designed by Ice Box of the United Kingdom from sculpted blocks of ice, based in New Delhi, India.

The first two locations opened in 2010.

Freeze Lounge is reconstructed every six month, and durability of ice is dependent upon constant sub-freezing temperatures during construction and operation. The walls, fixtures, and fittings are made entirely of ice, and are held together using a substance known as snice.

References 

Buildings and structures in Delhi